Vetturnimadam is a neighbourhood in Kanyakumari district of Tamil Nadu state in the peninsular India.

A Higher Secondary School viz., The Salvation Army Higher Secondary School is located in Vetturnimadam. An Arts and Science College viz., Pioneer Kumaraswamy College which is affiliated to Manonmaniam Sundaranar University, is situated in Vetturnimadam.

Christ the King church is one of the churches in Vetturnimadam. The Salvation Army Booth Tucker Memorial church is one more church situated in Vetturnimadam.

Nagercoil Town railway station is located nearer to Vetturnimadam and the distance between Vetturnimadam and the railway station is 1.7 km (Refer Google Maps).

References

External links 
 GeoHack - Vetturnimadam
 
 
Nagercoil
Cities and towns in Kanyakumari district